The 9th arrondissement of Paris (IXe arrondissement) is one of the 20 arrondissements of the capital city of France. In spoken French, it is referred to as le neuvième ("ninth").

The arrondissement, called Opéra, is located on the right bank of the River Seine. It contains many places of cultural, historical and architectural interest, including the Palais Garnier (home to the Paris Opera), on the Place de l'Opéra, together with the InterContinental Paris Le Grand Hotel's Café de la Paix, as well as Boulevard Haussmann, with the Galeries Lafayette and Printemps, two large department stores, in addition to the Le Figaro newspaper's headquarters.

The arrondissement also contains a number of theatres and music venues including the Olympia, Folies Bergère, Théâtre Mogador, Théâtre Édouard VII and Théâtre de Paris. Along with the 2nd and 8th arrondissements, it hosts one of the business centres of Paris, located around the Palais Garnier.

In 2019, the 9th arrondissement had a population of 60,026.

Geography

The land area of this arrondissement is 2.179 km2 (0.841 sq. miles, or 538 acres).

Main streets and squares
 Place de l'Opéra
 Boulevard des Capucines (partial)
 Boulevard des Italiens (partial)
 Rue des Martyrs (partial)
 Boulevard Haussmann (partial)
 Rue de la Chaussée-d'Antin
 Passage du Havre
 Square Montholon
 Boulevard de Clichy (partial)
 Rue La Fayette (partial)
 Rue de Provence (partial)
 Rue Saint-Lazare (partial)
 Place de Clichy (partial)
 Rue de la Victoire
 Rue de Caumartin
 Rue Laffitte
 Place Pigalle

Places of interest

 Bibliothèque-Musée de l'Opéra National de Paris
 Folies Bergère at 32, Rue Richer
 Fondation Dosne-Thiers
 Hôtel Drouot, auction house
 Opera Garnier ("Paris Opera")
 Galeries Lafayette (flagship store) at 40, Boulevard Haussmann
 Paris Olympia
 Printemps department store (flagship store)
 Maison Souquet, hotel
 Musée de la Franc-Maçonnerie
 Musée Grévin
 Musée Gustave Moreau at 14, Rue de la Rochefoucauld
 Musée du Parfum
 Musée de la Vie Romantique
 Notre-Dame-de-Lorette, Paris
 Parts of Pigalle area
 Takashimaya Paris

Wikimedia France has its offices in the arrondissement, at 28 Rue de Londres.

Economy

Groupe Danone has its head office in the 17 Boulevard Haussmann building in the 9th arrondissement. Danone moved there in 2002.

BNP Paribas has its head office in the arrondissement. Crédit Industriel et Commercial. Kroll Inc. also has an office in this arrondissement.

DotEmu has its head office in the 9th arrondissement.

Gameloft has its registered office and head office in the 9th arrondissement. It is on the fifth floor of 14 rue Auber.

Until June 1995, the head office of Société Générale was in this arrondissement. On that month the head office moved to the Société Générale Towers. The former head office remains as the company's registered office.

Google Paris has its offices in the arrondissement.

Demographics
The peak population of the 9th arrondissement occurred in 1901, when it had 124,011 inhabitants. Since then, the arrondissement has widely attracted business activity. As a result, the population was in 1999 only 55,838 inhabitants, while it held 111,939 jobs.

Historical population

Immigration

References

External links